The 2023 UCI Women's World Tour is a competition that includes twenty-eight road cycling events throughout the 2023 women's cycling season. It is the eighth edition of the UCI Women's World Tour, the ranking system launched by the Union Cycliste Internationale (UCI) in 2016. The competition began with the Women's Tour Down Under from 15 to 17 January, and will finish the Tour of Guangxi on 17 October.

Events
The race calendar for the 2023 season was announced in June 2022, with thirty races initially scheduled, up from twenty-three that were held in 2022. The calendar features several new races including the Women's Tour Down Under, Omloop Het Nieuwsblad and La Vuelta Femenina. Races outside Europe return for the first time since 2020, with two races in Australia, two races in China and one race in the United Arab Emirates.

In January, the Vårgårda Cykelklubb ceased the organisation of the Vårgårda West Sweden races due to economic reasons, reducing the calendar to twenty-eight races.

Changes for 2023 
The number of riders allowed per team has changed – stage races longer than five stages will have seven riders and two team support vehicles. For shorter events, organisers can decide whether to have six or seven riders per team.

The minimum salary per rider has increased, with a additional category for new professional ("neo-pro") riders.

2023 UCI Women's WorldTeams 
The fifteen Women's WorldTeams are automatically invited to compete in the events, with the top three Continental women's teams also invited automatically. Other Continental women's teams are invited by the organisers of each race.

References

 
UCI
UCI
UCI Women's World Tour
World Tour Women's